Spica is the brightest star in the constellation Virgo.

Spica may refer to:

Music
 Spica (band), a South Korean girl group
 "Spica/Hanabi/Moon", a 2003 maxi single by Lia
 "SPiCa", a song written by TokuP (とくP) and sung by Hatsune Miku
 "Spica", a composition for trumpet and piano by Hale A. VanderCook

Medicine
 Spica cast, a type of orthopedic cast
 Spica splint, a type of orthopedic splint

Naval vessels
 , a Sirius-class cargo ship of World War II
 , a Sirius-class combat stores ship of the United States Navy
 Spica-class torpedo boat, a class of Italian torpedo boats during World War II
 Spica, lead ship of the class, sold to Sweden in 1940 and renamed HSwMS Romulus (27)
 , several ships of the Swedish Navy
 German trawler V 804 Spica, a World War II vorpostenboot which served briefly as V 214 Spica and was a merchant fishing trawler pre- and post-war.

Technology
 Samsung i5700, a smartphone also known as the Samsung Spica
 SPICA (spacecraft), a proposed infrared space telescope by JAXA

Businesses
 SPICA (Società Pompe Iniezione Cassani & Affini), an Italian manufacturer of fuel injection systems

Fictional characters
 Spica, in the manga The Mythical Detective Loki Ragnarok
 Angela Spica, the second Engineer (comics)

Biology
 Spica (moth), a genus of moths belonging to the subfamily Thyatirinae